Xola Mlungisi Petse (born 10 July 1954) is a South African judge and Deputy President of the Supreme Court of Appeal of South Africa.

Biography 
Born in Qokolweni village, Mqanduli in the Eastern Cape and matriculated at Bensonvale High School. Petse graduated from the University of Fort Hare with a B. Proc in 1978 and from the University of Natal with an LL.B. degree in 1989.

Petse practised as an attorney from 1982 until 2005, when he was appointed a Judge of the High Court at Mthatha. In 2012 he was appointed to the Supreme Court of Appeal. In June 2019, Petse became the Deputy President of the Supreme Court of Appeal.

References 

1954 births
Living people
South African judges